Sontaya Keawbundit is a Thai volleyball player and a member of the Thailand national team.

Clubs 
  Idea Khonkaen (2009–2013)
  Chang (2011–2012)
  RC Cola Raiders (2013–2014)
  King-Bangkok (2015–2016)
  Khonkaen Star (2016–2017)
  Bangkok (2018–)

Awards

Clubs
 2012 Asian Club Championship –  Bronze medal, with Chang
 2012–13 Thailand League -  Champion, with Idea Khonkaen

National team

Senior team 
 2010 Asian Cup -  Silver Medal

References

External links 

1991 births
Living people
Sontaya Keawbundit
Sontaya Keawbundit
Universiade medalists in volleyball
Universiade bronze medalists for Thailand
Medalists at the 2013 Summer Universiade